Annassery is a village in the state of Kerala in India. The name derives from 'Anna' (Rice), the land of rice. It is located at Kozhikode district and it is about 14 km from Kozhikode and is part of Thalakulathur GramaPanchayat.

Transportation
Annassery connects to other parts of India through Koyilandy town.  The nearest airports are at Kannur and Kozhikode.  The nearest railway station is at Koyiandy.  The national highway no.66 passes through Koyilandy and the northern stretch connects to Mangalore, Goa and Mumbai.  The southern stretch connects to Cochin and Trivandrum.  The eastern National Highway No.54 going through Kuttiady connects to Mananthavady, Mysore and Bangalore.

References

Koyilandy area